Durham Park Township is a township in Marion County, Kansas, United States.  As of the 2010 census, the township population was 244, including the city of Durham.

Geography

Cities and towns
The township contains the following settlements:
 City of Durham.

Cemeteries
The township contains the following cemeteries:
 Durham Park Cemetery, located in Section 21 18S 2E.
 Frick Cemetery, located in Section 15 18S 2E.

References

Further reading

External links
 Marion County website
 City-Data.com
 Marion County maps: Current, Historic, KDOT

Townships in Marion County, Kansas
Townships in Kansas